Vedavijayapuram is a village in the Orathanadu taluk of Thanjavur district, Tamil Nadu, India.

Demographics 

As per the 2001 census, Vedavijayapuram had a total population of 1645 with 849 males and 796 females. The sex ratio was 938. The literacy rate was 79.27.

References 

 

Villages in Thanjavur district